is a Japanese international school located in Sar, Northern Governorate, Bahrain, near Manama.

The school was founded in 1984. As of 1989 it had 87 students, with none of them being Bahrainis.

Some students visited the Bahrain Bayan School in May 2018 as part of a cross culture initiative.

References

Further reading
 丹伊田 伸哉. (福島県郡山市立大島小学校・バハレーン日本人学校(前)). "バハレーン日本人学校における国際理解教育の取り組み(第4章国際理解教育・現地理解教育)." 在外教育施設における指導実践記録 27, 77–80, 2004. Tokyo Gakugei University. See profile at CiNii.

External links

 Bahrain Japanese School 
  
   (Archive)

International schools in Bahrain
Bahrain
Educational institutions established in 1984
Bahrain–Japan relations
1984 establishments in Bahrain